SM UC-34 was a German Type UC II minelaying submarine or U-boat in the German Imperial Navy during World War I. The U-boat was ordered on 20 November 1915 and was launched on 6 May 1916. She was commissioned into the German Imperial Navy on 25 September 1916 as SM UC-34. In nine patrols UC-34 was credited with sinking 21 ships, either by torpedo or by mines laid.

Aragons escort, the destroyer , rescued 300 to 400 survivors but then UC-34 torpedoed and sank her was well. Of 2,500 personnel who had been aboard Aragon, 610 were killed.

UC-34 was scuttled at Pola on 28 October 1918 on the surrender of Austria-Hungary.

Design
A German Type UC II submarine, UC-34 had a displacement of  when at the surface and  while submerged. The submarine was powered by two six-cylinder four-stroke diesel engines each producing  (a total of ), two electric motors producing , and two propeller shafts.

UC-34 was fitted with six  mine tubes, eighteen UC 200 mines, three  torpedo tubes (one on the stern and two on the bow), seven torpedoes, and one  Uk L/30 deck gun. Her complement was twenty-six crew members.

Summary of raiding history

Notes

References

References

Ships built in Hamburg
German Type UC II submarines
U-boats commissioned in 1916
U-boats scuttled in 1918
Maritime incidents in 1918
World War I minelayers of Germany
World War I submarines of Germany
World War I shipwrecks in the Adriatic Sea
1916 ships